Jalabi (also Romanized as Jalābī or  Jallābī; also known as Jalā’ and Jullāb) is a village in Takht Rural District, Takht District, Bandar Abbas County, Hormozgan Province, Iran. At the 2006 census, its population was 408, in 79 families.

References 

Populated places in Bandar Abbas County